This list of cemeteries in Cook County, Illinois includes currently operating, historical (closed for new interments), and defunct (graves abandoned or removed) cemeteries, columbaria, and mausolea which are historical and/or notable. Cook County includes the city of Chicago. It does not include pet cemeteries.

List

See also 
 List of cemeteries in Illinois

References 

Illinois-related lists
Cook County, Illinois